Cardiac veins can refer to:
 Coronary sinus
 Great cardiac vein (also known as the left coronary vein)
 Middle cardiac vein
 Small cardiac vein (also known as the right coronary vein)
 Smallest cardiac veins (also known as the Thebesean veins)
 Anterior cardiac veins